Fire cider is a pungent concoction that is made of apple cider vinegar, onions, garlic and horseradish, sometimes with citrus, ginger and hot peppers. It is steeped for weeks and used once it becomes tangy and hot. This home remedy drink is utilized to strengthen the immune system and ward off cold-weather illness.

Controversy 
In 2012 a Massachusetts company called Shire City Herbals trademarked the name Fire Cider and started selling it. However, Dana St. Pierre also claim to have trademarked it. A number of herbalists say that they have been using the term Fire Cider since 1980s. An October 2019 ruling established that ‘Fire Cider’ is a generic term and cannot be trademarked in the United States.

References 

Cider
Fermented drinks